J. carnea may refer to:

 Janaesia carnea, a South American moth
 Justicia carnea, a flowering plant